The fourth season of Homicide: Life on the Street aired in the United States on the NBC television network from October 20, 1995 to May 17, 1996 and contained 22 episodes.

The fourth season marked the debut of two characters: Detective Mike Kellerman (portrayed by Reed Diamond), who transfers from Arson to Homicide; and J. H. Brodie (portrayed by Max Perlich), a news cameraman who is hired as the unit's videographer. The season was also the last to feature Captain/Detective Megan Russert (portrayed by Isabella Hofmann) as a regular. Drug kingpin Luther Mahoney (portrayed by Erik Dellums) also makes his first appearance. Stuart Gharty (portrayed by Peter Gerety) also debuts in a guest appearance.

Guest stars include Lily Tomlin, Jeffrey Donovan, Bruce Campbell, Jerry Orbach, Benjamin Bratt, Jill Hennessy, Chris Rock, Marcia Gay Harden and Jay Leno. 

The DVD box set of season 4 was released for Region 1 on March 30, 2004. The set includes all 22 season 4 episodes on six discs.

Episodes
When first shown on network television, multiple episodes were aired out of order. The DVD present the episodes in the correct chronological order, restoring all storylines and character developments.

Cast
Returning for the fourth season of Homicide were Richard Belzer, Andre Braugher, Isabella Hofmann, Clark Johnson, Yaphet Kotto, Melissa Leo, and Kyle Secor. Daniel Baldwin and Ned Beatty did not return, as both were frustrated with the direction of the show. The characters of Beau Felton (Baldwin) and Stan Bolander (Beatty) were written out by engaging in drunken, inappropriate behavior while attending a policeman/firefighters convention in New York City; as a result both were suspended for 22 weeks (the length of the season). While they were only suspended for the duration of season 4, their departure from the series was not revealed until the next season.

Both Reed Diamond and Max Perlich joined the cast as Detective Mike Kellerman and J.H. Brodie, respectively. During the season, Diamond was credited as a main cast member while Perlich was a recurring cast member. The character of J.H. Brodie was supposedly based on David Simon. Season 4 also saw the debut of Peter Gerety as Stuart Gharty. The Gharty character would make a guest appearance once during the season as well as two guest appearances during the fifth season before becoming a main character in the final two seasons. The fourth season also saw the debut of Erik Dellums as drug kingpin Luther Mahoney. Despite only making one appearance during the season, the character would return many times during the fifth season serving as the main antagonist for the detectives.

Isabella Hofmann left the cast at the end of the season due to pregnancy with her and Daniel Baldwin's child, but would return for three guest appearances (two in person, one as a telephone voice) in the fifth season. Andre Braugher nearly left after the season, believing he had explored the Frank Pembleton character to its limit, but he decided to return after the producers agreed to give Pembleton a handicap by means of a stroke, portrayed at the end of season 4.  

Celebrity guest appearances include Lily Tomlin as murder suspect Rose Halligan in "The Hat". Jeffrey Donovan played twins Newton and Miles Dell with one being a thrill-killer in "Thrill of the Kill". Bruce Campbell played grief-stricken detective Jake Rodzinski in the two part "Justice". Law & Order stars Jerry Orbach, Benjamin Bratt, and Jill Hennessey played their characters Lennie Briscoe, Rey Curtis, and Claire Kincaid respectively in "For God and Country". Jay Leno played himself in a cameo appearance in "Sniper Part 1".

Reception

Ratings
Ratings for season 4 improved compared to season 3. Homicide ranked #66 and had an estimated audience of 8,900,000 a step up compared to Season 3 which ranked at #89 and had an estimated audience of 8,200,000.

Awards
Homicide would win two TCA Awards for "Outstanding Achievements In Drama" and "Program of the Year" as well as one Viewers for Quality Television award for "Best Quality Drama Series". Homicide was nominated for three Emmy Awards as Andre Brauger was nominated for Lead Actor in a Drama Series, Lily Tomlin was nominated for Guest Actress in a Drama Series for her guest appearance in the episode: "The Hat", and the show was nominated for Casting for a Drama Series. The show was also nominated for one Humanitas Prize for "60 Minute Category" as well as 3 NAACP Image Awards including "Outstanding Drama Series" while Brauger & Yaphet Kotto were both nominated for "Outstanding Lead Actor in a Drama Series".

References

 
 
 

 
1995 American television seasons
1996 American television seasons